Four Winds New Buffalo is a casino, hotel and entertainment venue located in New Buffalo Township, Michigan, near New Buffalo, which opened on August 2, 2007. It is the primary property of Four Winds Casinos, which are all owned and operated by the Pokagon Band of Potawatomi Indians.

Architecturally the casino's rotunda is built in the style of the Potawatomi people's traditional lodges.

In March 2015, USA Today named it one of the ten best casinos located outside of Las Vegas.

History 
Four Winds New Buffalo was first planned in May 1996. It expanded in 2011 due to its success, adding 250 hotel rooms and a multi-purpose facility.

Gaming 
The  gaming floor features over 3,000 slot machines and over 60 table games featuring games such as blackjack, craps, poker, and roulette. The Four Winds Casinos loyalty program, the W Club, is in use at this property. In 2021 the Michigan Gaming Control Board gave approval to the Pokagon to begin online and sports betting in all three Four Winds casino locations.

Dining 
The casino includes several dining establishments, including the Kankakee Grille, Timbers Deli, and the Copper Rock Steakhouse.

Hotel 
The facility includes a 416-room hotel. It originally opened with 165, and 251 rooms were added in 2012.

Entertainment

Silver Creek Event Center 
The Silver Creek Event Center is an event and concert venue at the casino. Opened in July 2012, the center has featured performers such as Diana Ross, Gregg Allman, Colbie Caillat, B.B. King, Peter Cetera, Michael Bolton,  Sammy Hagar, Foreigner, Huey Lewis & the News, Frankie Valli, Jackie Evancho, ZZ Top, Gladys Knight, Heart, Sheryl Crow, Kenny Loggins, Jay Leno, Eric Burdon, Joan Jett and the Blackhearts, Patti LaBelle, and Frank Sinatra, Jr. On March 13, 2020 Lewis Black recorded his stand-up comedy special Thanks For Risking Your Life live at The Silver Creek Event Center.

Shopping 
The facility includes limited shopping, including a Hard Rock Cafe Rock Shop, a gift shop, a clothing store, and a boutique featuring Landau, Michal Negrin, and Boccelli merchandise.

See also 

 Four Winds Casinos
 List of casinos in Michigan

References

External links 
 

2007 establishments in Michigan
Buildings and structures in Berrien County, Michigan
Casinos in Michigan
Casinos completed in 2007
Hotel buildings completed in 2007
Native American casinos
Tourist attractions in Berrien County, Michigan
Casino hotels
Native American history of Michigan
Pokagon Band of Potawatomi Indians